The Dsinezumi shrew (Crocidura dsinezumi), also known as the Japanese white-toothed shrew, is a species of musk shrew found in Japan and on Korea's Jeju Island. It is widespread, and considered to be of "least concern" by the  IUCN.

There has been a successful effort to breed C. dsinezumi as a laboratory animal.

References

External links
Shrew Photo Gallery: C. dsinezumi

Skull photos

Crocidura
Mammals of Korea
Mammals of Japan
Mammals described in 1842